The 1995–96 NBA season was the 26th season of the National Basketball Association in Cleveland, Ohio. During the off-season, the Cavaliers acquired All-Star guard, and three-point specialist Dan Majerle from the Phoenix Suns, and acquired 2-time Slam Dunk champion Harold Miner from the Miami Heat. After the first two games, Tyrone Hill was seriously injured in a car accident and missed 38 games, as the Cavs struggled losing their first seven games of the season. However, Hill returned in the second half of the season playing off the bench, being replaced by Michael Cage as the team's starting center. The Cavaliers played above .500 for the remainder of the season, holding a 26–20 record at the All-Star break, posting a 10–2 record in February, and finishing 3rd in the Central Division with a 47–35 record.

Terrell Brandon continued to improve leading the team with 19.3 points, 6.5 assists and 1.8 steals per game, and was selected for the 1996 NBA All-Star Game. In addition, Chris Mills had a stellar season averaging 15.1 points and 5.5 rebounds per game, while Bobby Phills provided the team with 14.6 points and 1.4 steals per game, and was named to the NBA All-Defensive Second Team. Danny Ferry became the team's starting power forward, and contributed 13.3 points per game, while Majerle played a sixth man role, averaging 10.6 points per game off the bench, Cage contributed 6.0 points and led the team with 8.9 rebounds per game, and Hill provided with 7.8 points and 5.5 rebounds per game off the bench. Head coach Mike Fratello finished in second place in Coach of the Year voting, while Brandon and Ferry both finished tied in third place in Most Improved Player voting.

However, in the Eastern Conference First Round of the playoffs, the Cavs were swept by the 5th-seeded New York Knicks in three straight games. Following the season, Majerle signed as a free agent with the Miami Heat after only playing just one season with the Cavaliers, while Cage signed with the Philadelphia 76ers, and Miner retired after only just four seasons in the NBA due to injuries, only playing just 19 games with the Cavaliers this season due to a knee injury. 

After missing the previous two seasons with a back injury, former All-Star center Brad Daugherty also retired, ending his eight-year career in the NBA with the Cavaliers.

Key Dates:

Offseason

Free Agents

Trades

Draft picks

Roster

Roster Notes
 Center Brad Daugherty missed the entire season due to a back injury.

Regular season

Season standings

Record vs. opponents

Game log

|- align="center" bgcolor=
|-
|| || || || || ||
|-

|- align="center" bgcolor=
|-
|| || || || || ||
|-

|- align="center" bgcolor=
|-
|| || || || || ||
|-

|- align="center" bgcolor=
|-
|| || || || || ||
|-

|- align="center" bgcolor=
|-
|| || || || || ||
|-

|- align="center" bgcolor=
|-
|| || || || || ||
|-

Playoffs

|- align="center" bgcolor="#ffcccc"
| 1
| April 25
| New York
| L 83–106
| Terrell Brandon (18)
| Michael Cage (8)
| Brandon, Majerle (5)
| Gund Arena16,419
| 0–1
|- align="center" bgcolor="#ffcccc"
| 2
| April 27
| New York
| L 80–84
| Terrell Brandon (21)
| Michael Cage (8)
| Terrell Brandon (12)
| Gund Arena17,232
| 0–2
|- align="center" bgcolor="#ffcccc"
| 3
| May 1
| @ New York
| L 76–81
| Terrell Brandon (19)
| Michael Cage (12)
| Terrell Brandon (7)
| Madison Square Garden19,763
| 0–3
|-

Player stats

Regular season

Playoffs

Player Statistics Citation:

Awards and records

Awards

Records

Milestones

All-Star

Transactions

Trades

Free Agents

Development League

References

 Cleveland Cavaliers on Database Basketball
 Cleveland Cavaliers on Basketball Reference

Cleveland Cavaliers seasons
Cleve
Cleve